is a Japanese radio controlled car driver who is considered to be the world's most successful with a record fourteen IFMAR World Championships in 1/12 scale electric, 1/10 scale Pan, 1/10 scale 2WD off road and 1/10 scale 4WD, all electric. Hirosaka's peers have nicknamed him "Master Masami". He was considered to be one of the highest paid drivers in RC racing, until he retired from the activity. His last IFMAR race was the 2008 world championship in Thailand. His retirement ceremony was on May 3, 2009.

Early years
Masami was first brought into RC car racing at the age of seven by his father Masaaki; a former motorcycle racer, who finished 2nd at the 1971 Suzuka 6 Hours, a research and development employee of ABC Hobby and later with Yokomo and radio controlled car racer and designer, when he brought him a Tamiya Lamborghini Countach. They raced together for four years until upon realizing Masami was the better driver, Masaaki retired from racing to focus on becoming his mechanic.

In 1987, during a world championship round for the 4WD off-road at Romsey, England, Hirosaka arrived as a privateer with a Schumacher CAT, bar being provided power sources from HPI Japan. He had shown promise during practice and was brought into attention by Phil Booth, Schumacher's works driver who referred him to Cecil Schumacher, who provided him a longer wheelbase version called the CAT XL, then unavailable in Japan and was raced by a majority of racers. Despite being near-stock with much of the running gear added on from his old CAT, Hirosaka managed to win the title. After the win, he was given numerous offers from sponsors before he ultimately settled with Yokomo.

Later activities
As well as driving for Yokomo and Associated Electrics where he helps develop and design new cars and tests the resulting prototypes, Hirosaka held a job as a sales engineer for Yokomo. Of all his IFMAR championship wins, only his first title was won driving cars from neither of these manufacturers. He was driving a Schumacher CAT XL.

For once or twice a week, he practices for 100 runs, a majority of these is done on-road to improve his reflexes.

In a 1998 interview with Germany's KEIL DTM magazine, Hirosaka listed his other hobbies as computers and theater. His father who is now semi-retired, runs an RC car preparation service whilst doing contract work for Kyosho. In a 1999 interview with RCCA,  he said that he  has appeared several times on Japanese TV. He also says that he has several non-RC sponsors, such as Pioneer.

In his later career, he mentored teammate and compatriot Naoto Matsukura and was the lead organizer of the 2015 IFMAR 1:10 Electric Off-Road World Championship

Equipment
Throughout his career, Masami preferred to race with stick transmitters, largely as when he began racing, Japanese branded wheel transmitters did not exist; he once experimented with wheels but felt sticks gave better car control. Up until 1987, he used Futaba transmitter; after that he switched to KO Propo which he used through his career. Under his arrangement with Yokomo, his car ran on Reedy motors, a subsidiary of Associated Electrics.

Throughout his career, Masami has always raced in the green over white with pink flames (similar style to those found typically in hot rods), but since the 1990s, the pink colour has become less dominant part of the colour as he added the orange and red to form part of his current colour scheme.

Achievements

Throughout his competition career, Hirosaka has a total of 307 victories out of a total of 447 races, with 47 second-place finishes and 27 third.

He has a total of 37 World Championship starts with 25 podium appearances including 14 championship titles and 35 A-main appearances.

Out of a total of 70 JMRCA All-Japan Championship appearances, he won 52 of those spanning 21 consecutive years (1986-2006), 67 of those are A-main appearances.

In 1998, he is one of two drivers to achieve an electric car clean sweep at the JMRCA All-Japan Championship, the only driver to achieve this more than once (also 1987, 1989 and 1992) and the only one to achieve five out of five wins in eligible classes, a feat no longer possible since 2005 when the 1:10 Racing class was discontinued.

An article by Radio Control Car Action list him on the top spot as the five greatest driver of all-time in 2010 In the 2015 edition of the Top 10 best of all-time, he was beaten to the spot by Ryan Cavalieri.

Listed in RCCA in its May issues as one of the 10 Best Drivers between 1989 up to 1992. When the readers ranking was introduced, he was ranked 5th in 1996, 2nd in 1998 and 3rd in 1999. Hirosaka is the only few non-US drivers to be honored and the only foreigner to regularly appear in the list.

Complete results

IFMAR Worlds

JMRCA All-Japan Championship results

Notes

References

External links
 

RC car racing drivers
1970 births
Living people
People from Tokyo
Radio-controlled car personalities
Yokomo